Joseph Cooper (16 February 1918 – August 1992) was an English professional footballer. A left back who could also play at right back, he played in the Football League for Crewe Alexandra. He started his career on the books of Blackpool, but did not make any League appearances for the Seasiders.

References

1918 births
1992 deaths
English footballers
People from Reddish
Blackpool F.C. players
Crewe Alexandra F.C. players
Association football fullbacks